is a  karst pond on Minamidaitōjima, Okinawa Prefecture, Japan.  Ōike is the largest pond containing both freshwater and seawater. Fresh water is mixed with seawater beneath.

Geology
The island is composed of elevated limestone from its atoll. Rainwater has dissolved the limestone leading to a depression in the ground (sinkhole). This has filled with water to become a pond.

Natural history
On the north of the pond extends an area of wetland with large communities of  Bruguera gymnorrhiza, a mangrove plant, which was designated as a Natural monument since it is unique in freshwater on March 18, 1975. Other plants include Scirpus tabemaemontani C. C. Gemlin, Panicum repens L. Najas marina and Vallisneria natans.

Common carp and Carassius auratus langsdorfii were introduced in 1910 and tilapia in 1955.  Birds include mallard, Pacific reef heron, common moorhen and cattle egret.

Footnotes

References
Ministry of the Environment, Environment of lakes and ponds in Japan part 2 1995, Nature and Environment Research Center, 
Masaaki Tanaka, Lakes and ponds in Japan 2 2004, University of Nagoya Press, 

Lakes of Japan
Landforms of Okinawa Prefecture
Karst
Ponds of Japan
Bodies of water of Japan